There are three main categories of heliports in Norway.  Most land-based heliports are built in conjunction with or at hospitals. They are owned and operated by the respective hospital trust and are served by the Norwegian Air Ambulance. A second major group are offshore oil platforms and other installations related to the petroleum industry. These are owned and operated by the oil or gas field operator. The third-category are general-purpose heliports. These are often owned by helicopter operating companies.

Norwegian legislation requires that all heliports permanent heliports and helipads which have an average twelve or more weekly aircraft movements gave approval from the Civil Aviation Authority of Norway (CAA). Exceptions include offshore and ship-mounted helipads and those situated in Svalbard. However, offshore helipads are required to meet a set of regulations. The situation on Svalbard is made complicated due to the Svalbard Treaty. Norwegian authorities therefore do not require permits for construction of heliports and helipads on the archipelago.

The most extensive part of the Norwegian helicopter transport are offshore commuting to oil platforms situated in the North Sea and the Norwegian Sea. These operate out of conventional airports, serving helipads on board the offshore installations. The only scheduled passenger services to a heliport operate between Bodø Airport and Værøy Heliport. Former heliports on Værøy and Røst provided such services between 1970 and 1986.

The Norwegian Air Ambulance operates twelve medical helicopters out of eleven bases, with two based at Lørenskog Heliport, Ahus. All except three bases are situated on hospital grounds. Thirty hospitals have a helicopter landing site within  of its emergency department, of which twenty-four have CAA approval. Sixteen hospitals lack a helipad.

Heliports
The list includes heliports approved by the CAA and those with an International Civil Aviation Organization airport code (ICAO code). It includes closed facilities with ICAO codes, but excludes any heliports located at conventional airports.

The list notes the heliports name; municipality or, in the case of Svalbard, the settlement; the county, sea or Svalbard; the type of heliport (general purpose, medical and offshore); and the owner of the facility.

References

 
Heliport
Heliport
Heliport
Norway